LGGS J004431.71+415629.1 is a possible red supergiant in the Andromeda Galaxy, and would be one of the largest stars known being 1,508 solar radii.

Possible foreground object
The star is mentioned in the original selection paper as being one of three (out of 354) "having velocities consistent with their actually being foreground stars".  Although the colour of LGGS J004431.71+415629.1 makes it appear to be a red supergiant (RSG), it is described as being "right on the borderline between the separation of RSGs and foreground stars".

See also
 WOH G 64
 UY Scuti
 Stephenson 2 DFK 1

References

TIC objects
J00443164+4156289
Andromeda (constellation)
Andromeda Galaxy